Marcelin Tamboulas  (born 24 April 1980 in Bangui) is a Central African Republic striker, who plays for Congo Premier League side AC Léopards.

Career
He signed a contract in August 2007 with Maltese club Birkirkara FC. After five games with the team he travelled home for personal reasons and failed to return, resulting in a release from his contract at the end of December 2007.

International career
Tamboulas is a first option as a striker with the national team, however he can also adapt to play as a right wing midfielder.

He played for the Central African Republic national football team at the 2005 CEMAC Cup.

References

External links

 

1980 births
Living people
Central African Republic footballers
Central African Republic international footballers
Olympic Real de Bangui players
FC 105 Libreville players
Expatriate footballers in Gabon
Birkirkara F.C. players
Expatriate footballers in Malta
People from Bangui
Central African Republic expatriate sportspeople in Gabon
Central African Republic expatriate footballers
Expatriate footballers in the Democratic Republic of the Congo
Expatriate footballers in the Republic of the Congo
TP Mazembe players

Association football forwards